Victoria Zabala (born ) is an Argentine female volleyball player. She is part of the Argentina women's national volleyball team.

She participated in the 2013 FIVB Volleyball Women's U23 World Championship,  and 2018 FIVB Volleyball Women's Nations League
 
At club level she played for Boca Juniors in 2018.

References

External links 

 FIVB profile
 http://japan2018.fivb.com/en/news/argentinian-women-called-up-for-2018?id=73671

1992 births
Living people
Argentine women's volleyball players
Place of birth missing (living people)